Phu Sing is a district (amphoe) in the southwestern part of Sisaket province, northeastern Thailand.

History
The minor district (king amphoe) was created on 1 April 1991, when the six tambons Khok Tan, Huai Ta Mon, Huai Tuekchu, Lalom, Takhian Ram, and Dong Rak were split off from Khunkhan district. It was upgraded to a full district on 8 September 1995.

Geography
The district is bounded in the south by the Dangrek Range. Neighboring districts are (from the west clockwise): Buachet of Surin province, Khukhan, and Khun Han of Sisaket Province, and Oddar Meancheay of Cambodia.

Administration
The district is divided into seven sub-districts (tambons), which are further subdivided into 85 villages (mubans). There are no municipal (thesaban) areas, and seven tambon administrative organizations (TAO).

References

External links
amphoe.com

Phu Sing